Emeghara is a surname. Notable people with the surname include:

Ifeanyi Emeghara (born 1984), Nigerian footballer
Innocent Emeghara (born 1989), Nigerian-born Swiss footballer

Surnames of Nigerian origin